Jewell Obert Waugh (June 13, 1910 – November 16, 2006) was an American politician who served in the Iowa House of Representatives from 1967 to 1973.

He died of heart failure on November 16, 2006, in West Branch, Iowa at age 96.

References

1910 births
2006 deaths
Republican Party members of the Iowa House of Representatives
20th-century American politicians